This is a list of events and medallists at the 2009 Canada Games.

Athletics

Men's

Women's

Baseball

Basketball

Beach Volleyball

Canoe/Kayak

Men's

Canoe

Kayak

Women's

Canoe

Kayak

Cycling

Diving

Golf

Rowing

Rugby

Sailing

Soccer

Softball

Swimming

Men's events

Women's events

Tennis

Triathlon

Volleyball

Wrestling

Men's

Women's

External links
 2009 Canada Games Results

events